

Treblinka

Treblinka, located northeast of Warsaw, Poland, was once a concentration camp that was used to systematically murder nearly one million Jews. Treblinka was the second most deadly extermination camp after Auschwitz. On the grounds of Treblinka, there have been recent archaeological findings of previously unknown gas chambers, artefacts, and mass graves. By examining these discoveries at Treblinka, I hope to present a deeper understanding of the horrors that the Nazis attempted to cover up as a result of their disregard for human life. Additionally, there will be a discovery and exploration of the recent findings of Caroline Sturdy Colls’ excavation at Treblinka.

Recent findings

Caroline Sturdy Colls, a Professor Conflict Archeology and Genocide Investigation at Staffordshire University, who specializes in Holocaust studies, led a team of archaeologists in the most recent excavations at the grounds of Treblinka extermination camp (Wikipedia Nov 11). Colls and her team are responsible for unearthing the most compelling archaeological findings at Treblinka in 2011. These discoveries prove the value of archaeology when documenting historical sites, discovering information and details that have been previously unavailable to historians. During this first excavation, project leader Colls discovered that the Nazis had built a fake train station with a ticket counter and clock (Svoboda 2016). "Jews who were sent there were told they were going to a transit camp but were actually arriving at one of the largest death camps the Nazis had ever developed. From the Jewish Virtual Library, I learned that the gas chambers and mass graves were discovered from the use of “special, ground-penetrating radar equipment and other advanced technology” (Jerusalem Post 2012). By using this technology, the archaeologists were able to recover information without disturbing the burial grounds, which would violate Jewish laws concerning respectful of the dead, also known as Jewish Halacha Law.

Colls has written her own book, Holocaust Archaeologies: Approaches and Future Directions, and is also one of the authors of Human Remains in Society: Curation and Exhibition in the Aftermath of Genocide and Mass-violence which was published in 2016 and mainly written by Jean-Marc Dreyfus and Élisabeth Anstett. Within these books, Colls explains to her audience what her first-hand experiences were when encountering concentration camp sites. In her own book, Colls writes, “The discovery of one of the gas chambers alongside other evidence has provided new insight into the lengths that the Nazis went to in order to hide their crimes” (Colls 38). The team of archaeologists were shocked to find the deeply hidden evidence of the Nazi’s crimes, and it made them wonder how much more evidence could be hidden.

As for the book that Colls collaborated with Dreyfus and Anstett on, she got a chapter in the book to talk about a through the history of the Holocaust as well as her expertise on concentration camp archaeology. Within this chapter, Colls reveals that in the post-war period only “Shallow excavations were carried out in a small number of areas and, although human remains and other evidence were observed, they were not thoroughly examined” (Colls 172). Colls points out the principal reason why victims of Treblinka had never got justice. The excavations in which took place after the war were forced and rushed, “As a result, the common perception is that the Nazis succeeded in completely obliterating all traces of their crimes in Treblinka” (Colls 173). The archaeologists found broken pieces of the tile while lined the gas chamber walls and had stars of David carved into them. These tiles were red and yellow, and believed to be from the older gas chamber at Treblinka. There were two gas chambers but the smaller one of the two stopped being used after the second bigger chamber was built. Colls had learned previously from a survivor that the Nazis staged the gas chambers to look harmless so that the victims would not struggle to go inside. Colls goes on to say the site was abandoned by the Nazis in 1943 and was not protected until it was levelled to create a memorial in the 1960s.

Colls and her team used remote sensing technology to detect things underground and put the data together in order to understand what actually happened on the grounds of Treblinka. Over time there have been trees planted over where the former extermination and labour camp areas, which has forced Colls and her team to develop unique surveying techniques. In order to get accurate readings of what was hidden under the ground, LiDAR had to be used. Colls states, “This technique emits multiple laser pulses from a laser scanner mounted on an aircraft, and the return of these pulses can be measured in order to determine the elevations of the ground, structures, vegetation and anything else with which they come into contact” (Colls 177). This technique was especially helpful for recreating the layout of the camp through trees and erosion that has occurred in the last seventy years. Magnetometry, which measures the magnitude and direction of a magnetic field, was also helpful to the archaeologists. It detects any evidence of burning or changes to the Earth’s magnetic field, which could help them find cremated human bodies. The discoveries of mass graves and gas chambers were successfully found while adhering to the Jewish law.

Colls describes her work at Treblinka as “far from complete” (Colls 186). While Colls and her team have uncovered ground-breaking evidence, there are many limitations to their work including the Jewish Halacha Law. She goes on to state that after finding this evidence, “archaeologists and other professionals are certainly in a better position than ever before to shed new light on the crimes perpetrated during the Holocaust and should rise to the challenge of addressing the ethical issues that will arise when attempting to do so” (Colls 188). Although the bodies and other evidence are out of sight, the need for justice for the victims are just beginning to be served.

Conservation

The grounds are currently a memorial for those who were systematically murdered there. It is against Jewish law to disrupt the ground of this essentially large cemetery; therefore, it is a desolate place of mourning. There are occasional gatherings of the decedents of the victims to honour them at the site. Overall Treblinka is reserved as a historical and archaeological heritage monument.

Importance and future work

Hundreds of thousands of people were murdered at Treblinka, a fraction of Europe’s population was murdered, and future generations need to be informed of the horrors of the Holocaust so that it never happens again. The Holocaust thrived on propaganda, which launched Hitler into power. In 1943, the Nazis destroyed what they could before leading the remaining prisoners on a death march, during which tens of thousands of prisoners would later die.

The physical remains of a place constitute a meaningful location in historical memory. If a visitor of Treblinka is Jewish and knows someone who was murdered there, they may have a much deeper and more meaningful experience compared to an atheist from America who simply wanted to see the remains in person. Hundreds of thousands of people were murdered at Treblinka, because of this there are limited records of names of its victims. The United States Holocaust Memorial Museum has a database in which decedents of the victims could attempt to find a record of their relatives. This type of location and horror tends to bring people from different walks of life together to pay respects to the prisoner’s wrongful deaths. Some survivors of Treblinka have come out and spoke about the horrors to inform the world and even to shut down the Holocaust deniers. Sixty-seven people survived Treblinka, but the last living survivor died in 2016, so there is no longer anyone alive who can describe Treblinka from a first-hand perspective.

Colls has not stopped her work after the 2011 findings and will continue to try and unearth the evidence of the Nazi’s crimes during World War II. Archaeologists may find even more horrific evidence from the Nazi’s attempts to destroy their atrocities. Considering archaeologists continue to find further evidence of the Holocaust seventy years after the fact has left Colls and her team wondering if there is more to discover. Although Colls and here team question their own work. How much of a contribution is it to find this evidence seventy years after the fact? Coll’s team faces some hardships with the restrictions of their excavations. Yet, there are new technological advancements such as LiDAR which benefits both archaeologists and the Jewish Law.

In contrast, there are many people who believe the Holocaust never happened. These people have made up theories and conspiracies that are not based on any facts. Yet, there is credible, scientific evidence in which historians, as well as archaeologists, base their work on. This is one of the main reasons why these sites should be preserved and studied. Prior to the findings in 2011, Holocaust deniers claimed there was not any evidence of exterminations at Treblinka, and that it was simply a transit camp which moved Jews from Poland to other locations across Europe (Wikipedia November 18). Colls and her team have proved these people wrong and brought to light the true horrors that took place within the barbed wire fences of Treblinka.

Colls and her team’s archaeological findings changed the course of Holocaust archaeology. Their work also challenged what humanity thought we knew about World War II. Although once a place horror, Treblinka now serves as a memorial for those who seek it. My own narrative is now part of this ongoing documentation of Treblinka that I can share with those looking to seek more information about this sometimes forgotten or ignored human rights tragedy.

References

 Svoboda, Elizabeth. “Unearthing the Atrocities of Nazi Death Camps.” Scientific American, 30 Apr. 2016, https://www.scientificamerican.com/article/unearthing-the-atrocities-of-nazi-death-camps/.
 Pruden, Wesley. “Treblinka Concentration Camp: History & Overview.” History & Overview of Treblinka, Jerusalem Post, 19 Jan. 2012, https://www.jewishvirtuallibrary.org/history-and-overview-of-treblinka.
 Berenbaum, Michael. “Treblinka.” Encyclopædia Britannica, Encyclopædia Britannica, Inc., 14 Aug. 2019, https://www.britannica.com/place/Treblinka.
 Jean-Marc Dreyfus, Élisabeth Anstett and Caroline Sturdy Colls 2016 Human Remains in Society: Curation and Exhibition in the Aftermath of Genocide and Mass-violence. Manchester University Press.
 Caroline Sturdy Colls 2015 Holocaust Archaeologies: Approaches and Future Directions. Springer International Publishing Switzerland.
 “Treb04 6002 SF4 Yellow and Red Tile with Star on Underside.” Centre of Archaeology, Department of Humanities and Performing Arts, 29 Aug. 2018, https://blogs.staffs.ac.uk/archaeology/projects/holocaust-landscapes/genius-and-genocide/finding-treblinka/project-results/preliminary-results-of-the-survey-at-treblinka-ii-the-extermination-camp/treb04-6002-sf4-yellow-and-red-tile-with-star-on-underside/.

Archaeological sites in Poland
Historical archaeology
Holocaust historiography